Anycles cupreus is a moth of the subfamily Arctiinae. It was described by Schaus in 1901. It is found in Mexico.

References

Moths described in 1901
Euchromiina
Moths of Central America